The Harbin Metro is the rapid transit system of Harbin, the provincial capital of Heilongjiang Province in northeastern China.́ The system began operation on 26 September 2013 with the opening of Line 1. The system has a total of three lines as of November 2021.

Hours and fares
In the winter time, the metro begins operation at 6:00 am and the last train departs at 9:00 pm. Fares range froḿ ¥2 to ¥4 depending on trip distance. Single-ride and rechargeable fare cards may be purchased at ticket windows or automatic fare card machines in each station.

Lines in operation

Line 1

Line 1 is oriented along the east–west axis of the urban area of Harbin, from northeast to southwest.

Line 2

Line 2 opened on September 19, 2021. It is 28.7 km in length with 19 stations.

Line 3

Line 3 is a circular line around the urban area of Harbin. The first phase consisted of 5 stations and opened in 2017.

History
The Harbin Metro was approved by the State Council in 2005. The initial investment was estimated to cost US$643 million.́ The project was headed by the Harbin Municipal People's Government Metro Construction, which established a Track Traffic Construction Office led by the city's construction commission.́ In 2006, an official "Initiation Ceremony of Harbin Metro Trial Project" was held, signifying the actual implementation of Harbin Line 1 project. The builders made use of a 10.1 km air defense tunnel built in the 1970s as part of the "7381" civil air-defense, which forms part of Line 1.

Construction on Line 1 began a second time on 29 September 2009 and was later halted and began a third time in March 2010. In March 2011 the contract for traincars for first line was signed with Changchun Railway Vehicles co. ltd. The target date for opening of the first line, 17.47 km in length, with 18 stations was set to the end of 2012. Line 1 opened on 26 September 2013.

Future lines 
Loop Line 3 with 12 more stations under construction will fully open in 2024.

On April 18, 2016, the official website of Harbin Metro Group released the "Announcement of Environmental Impact Assessment for the Second Phase of Harbin Urban Rail Transit Construction Plan (2017-2022)". The planned line length is about 85 km, including 65 stations. According to updated news in 2023, only Lines 4 and 5 are planned in second phase of Harbin Metro. The length will be shortened to 70.6 km with 54 stations.

See also
 List of metro systems

References

External links
 Government site of Harbin

 
Rapid transit in China
Metro